Samuel Moffett may refer to:

Samuel Austin Moffett (1864–1939), American Presbyterian missionary to Korea
Samuel H. Moffett (1916–2015), his son, professor, missionary and scholar on Christianity in the Far East

See also
Samuel M. Ralston (Samuel Moffett Ralston, 1857–1925), American politician in the state of Indiana